"Lily the Pink" is a 1968 song released by the UK comedy group The Scaffold, which reached No. 1 in the UK Singles Chart. It is a modernisation of an older folk song titled "The Ballad of Lydia Pinkham". The lyrics celebrate the "medicinal compound" invented by Lily the Pink, and humorously chronicle the "efficacious" cures it has brought about, such as inducing morbid obesity to cure a weak appetite, or bringing about a sex change as a remedy for freckles.

The Scaffold version
The Scaffold's record, released in November 1968, became No. 1 in the UK Singles Chart for the four weeks encompassing the Christmas holidays that year.

Backing vocalists on the recording included Graham Nash (of The Hollies), Elton John (then Reg Dwight), and Tim Rice; while Jack Bruce (of Cream) played the bass guitar.

The lyrics include a number of in-jokes. For example, the line "Mr Frears had sticky out ears" refers to film director Stephen Frears, who had worked with The Scaffold early in their career; while the line "Jennifer Eccles had terrible freckles" refers to the song "Jennifer Eccles" by The Hollies, the band Graham Nash was about to leave.

Charts

Covers, derivative versions, and similar songs
In North America The Irish Rovers released the song a few months after The Scaffold's version. It reached #38 in Canada and #113 in the U.S. in early 1969. It also rose to the Top 20 on the Easy Listening charts of both nations. The release from the Rovers' Tales to Warm Your Mind Decca LP became a second-favourite behind "The Unicorn".

The song has since been adopted by the folk community. It has been performed live by the Brobdingnagian Bards and other Celtic-style folk and folk artists.

The song was successfully adapted into French (as "Le sirop typhon") by Richard Anthony in 1969. That version described humorously the devastating effects of a so-called panacée (universal medicine). In Quebec, it was adapted as "Monsieur Bong Bong", and mocked the Hong Kong flu pandemic of 1968–1969.

In 1968, an Italian version ("La sbornia", the bender) was made by the band I Gufi, describing the effects of drinking alcohol on several humorous, fictional characters.

In 1968, famous Finnish comedy actor Simo Salminen recorded a version in Finnish ("Tenkka-tenkka-poo", "a troubled situation"), which describe misfortunes of the storyteller from primary school to the last judgement.

In 1969, in Catalonia, the musical and humoristic group  released a Catalan version entitled "La Trinca".

In 1969, a Danish version ("Lille Fru Flink", "Little Mrs Friendly") was recorded by Grethe Sønck. It's a song about having a drink and feeling good amongst friends.

In 1952, Johnny Standley recorded "Grandma's Lye Soap", a song about soap with similarly bizarre ways of curing maladies.

Earlier folk song

The U.S. American folk (or drinking) song on which "Lily the Pink" is based is generally known as "Lydia Pinkham" or "The Ballad of Lydia Pinkham". It has the Roud number 8368. The song was inspired by Lydia E. Pinkham's Vegetable Compound, a well-known herbal-alcoholic patent medicine for women. Supposed to relieve menstrual and menopausal pains, the compound was mass-marketed in the United States from 1876 onwards.

The song was certainly in existence by the time of the First World War. F. W. Harvey records it being sung in officers' prisoner-of-war camps in Germany, and ascribes it to Canadian prisoners. According to Harvey, the words of the first verse ran:

In many versions, the complaints which the compound had cured were highly ribald in nature. During the Prohibition era (1920–33) in the United States, the medicine (like other similar patent medicines) had a particular appeal as a readily available 40-proof alcoholic drink, and it is likely that this aided the popularity of the song. A version of the song was the unofficial regimental song of the Royal Tank Corps during World War II.

Cultural references
At the 2019 Brecon and Radnorshire by-election, the Official Monster Raving Loony Party candidate, Berni Benton, stood under the name "Lady Lily the Pink". She polled 334 votes (1.05% of those cast), placing her in 5th place out of 6.

See also
List of number-one singles of 1968 (Ireland)
List of number-one singles from the 1960s (UK)
List of number-one singles in Australia during the 1960s

References

External links
 

Songs about fictional female characters
1968 singles
UK Singles Chart number-one singles
Number-one singles in Australia
Irish Singles Chart number-one singles
American folk songs
English folk songs
Novelty songs
The Scaffold songs
Song recordings produced by Norrie Paramor
Songs of World War I
Christmas number-one singles in the United Kingdom
Songs written by Mike McGear
Parlophone singles